Strange Constellations is the first studio album by the Norwegian indie rock group Heroes & Zeros, released on 23 April 2007. All lyrics were written by Hans Jørgen Undelstvedt, all music by Hans Jørgen Undelstvedt, Lars Løberg Tofte, and Arne Kjelsrud Mathisen.

Track listing

External links
 Heroes & Zeros official website
 Heroes & Zeros blog on My Opera

2007 albums
Heroes & Zeros albums